Prairie City was a gold-mining community that once sat on the American River in the Sierra Nevada foothills, near present-day Folsom in Sacramento County, California.

The mining village was first announced in June 1853 in the Sacramento Daily Union. A July article mentions that the city has about 1500 inhabitants. What was left of the town is believed to be covered in river rocks, from gold dredging of the American River in the early 1900s.

When construction was being performed for the freeway on-ramp near an Intel building, a few bodies were unearthed during construction. Though the names of these people are unknown, it is assumed they were Prairie City residents. Their skeletal remains were re-buried in the Mormon Island relocation cemetery, south of Folsom Lake.

Present day
The general site of Prairie City is a California Historical Landmark (#464).

The Folsom subdivision Prairie Oaks was named for it, because it is believed that the city once stood in this general area.

See also
 California Historical Landmarks in Sacramento County, California

References

External links
 Prairie City History, pictures

Former settlements in Sacramento County, California
Mining communities of the California Gold Rush
American River (California)
California Historical Landmarks